Dayanara Torres Delgado (born October 28, 1974) is a Puerto Rican actress, singer, model, writer and beauty queen who won Miss Universe 1993.

Torres was discovered at age 17 while walking through the Plaza de Toa Alta in her hometown, and was invited to represent Toa Alta in the annual Miss Puerto Rico pageant. She won the pageant and the right to represent Puerto Rico in the 1993 Miss Universe pageant. In 1992, she participated in the Miss International pageant and became a semi-finalist. The same year, she earned second place at the Queen of the World contest.

Torres won the crown in the Miss Universe pageant held in Mexico in May 1993. Torres' victory in the pageant caused some controversy because of the claim that she was still a minor; however, Torres had turned 18 several months before the contest.  Her victory also raised some eyebrows, as she did not top any of the pageant's segments.  When Torres returned home to Puerto Rico, she was received with a parade.

During and after her reign as Miss Universe, she became an ambassador for UNICEF, traveling through Asia and Latin America in support of the organization.  She created the Dayanara Torres Foundation which has provided scholarships to poor students in Puerto Rico and the Philippines. In 1994, she went to Manila to crown the new Miss Universe and during the ceremony, she sang "A Whole New World" as a duet with Peabo Bryson.

Career

Torres in the Philippines
After the 1994 Miss Universe pageant, Torres landed several movie roles, made television appearances, and received offers to endorse products.  She became a celebrity in the Philippines and lived in the country for five years. During her time in the Philippines, Torres learned to speak Filipino, the national language of the country.

She appeared in more than 10 movies, including Hataw Na, a film with Filipino actor and singer Gary Valenciano (who is half-Puerto Rican).  During that time, she also filmed Linda Sara (1994), a Puerto Rican film directed by Jacobo Morales in which she was paired with fellow Puerto Rican singer, Chayanne.  She also became a staple figure on Philippine television every Sunday on the show ASAP Mania, where her dancing skills gained her the informal title "Dancing Queen."

Return to Puerto Rico
Torres returned to Puerto Rico in 1998 and as a singer released her only album called Antifaz. It reached the top of Billboard charts in Latin America and the Philippines. She also starred in several theater productions on the island.  That same year, a "Dayanara" doll was released and sold out in both Puerto Rico and the Philippines.

On September 1, 2005, Torres debuted in an American soap opera, playing a small role in The Young and the Restless.  The program's producers expressed an interest in future appearances.  To date, Torres has not made any other appearances on the show.  Torres later starred in Watch Over Me, a MyNetworkTV primetime drama.

In 2008, Torres was included in People magazine's "Most Beautiful People" list.  During the celebration ceremony, Torres stated she authored the self-help book Married to Me when she failed to find a book to help her with her 2003 separation from Marc Anthony in bookstores.

Return to the Philippines
In 2017, Torres made a return to the country as a judge for Miss Universe 2016, along with various guest appearances on Philippine television.

In February 2017, Torres was asked whether or not she would be willing to do a romantic TV series with her former boyfriend and leading man Aga Muhlach; she said she was more than willing to do so.

Personal life
Torres has two older brothers, José and Joey, and a younger sister, Jeannette. She finished her studies in Colegio Santa Rosa in Bayamón, Puerto Rico, with the intention of going to college to become an orthodontist.

While she was in the Philippines, Torres had a four-year relationship with Filipino actor Aga Muhlach, now married to Charlene Gonzalez, a Miss Universe 1994 top six finalist. Torres and Muhlach first met on the set of her first Philippine movie, Basta't Kasama Kita ("As Long As I'm with You").

Torres married singer Marc Anthony on May 9, 2000, in Las Vegas. They have two sons, Cristian Anthony Muñiz (5 February 2001) and Ryan Anthony Muñiz (16 August 2003). Their marriage was rocky, and they separated in the summer of 2002.  They later reconciled and renewed their vows in a ceremony held in Puerto Rico in December 2002.
 
The couple's final separation was in October 2003 and Torres filed for divorce in January 2004. The divorce was finalized June 1, 2004.

In June 2014, a divorce court approved an increase from $13,400 to $26,800 in monthly child support payments; Torres had originally asked for monthly payments of $123,426 alleging Marc Anthony had spent only 35 days with their two children in 2012 but the Court found he had spent 71 days.

On February 4, 2019, Torres announced she was diagnosed with skin cancer.

Accolades 
 Press Club of the Philippines 1995 (a.k.a. PMPC Star Awards for TV) – "Best New TV Personality Award" for ASAP on ABS-CBN 2 (Winner)
 Premios Juventud 2006 – "Chica Que Me Quita El Sueño" (Winner)
 Premios Juventud 2007 – "Supermodelo Latina" (Winner)
 Premios Juventud 2008 – "Quiero Vestir Como Ella / Ella Tiene Estilo" (Nominated)
 Leading Ladies of Entertainment in 2019.

Discography 
Album
Antifaz (1998)

Filmography

Film

Television

Books
2006 – Sonrisas Sanas y Hermosas de Ricky y Andrea (co-author with Steven Fink)
2008 – Married To Me: How Committing To Myself Led to Triumph After Divorce (co-author with her sister Jeannette Torres-Álvarez)
2009 – Casada Conmigo Misma: Como Triunfé Despues Del Divorcio (Spanish translation of her book "Married To Me:...")

See also

List of Puerto Ricans
History of women in Puerto Rico

References

External links

Dayanara Torres interview on UPN-MyNetworkTV drama Watch Over Me
Dayanara's own forum in Univision Network

1974 births
Actresses from San Juan, Puerto Rico
Living people
Miss International 1992 delegates
Miss Puerto Rico winners
Miss Universe 1993 contestants
Miss Universe winners
People from Toa Alta, Puerto Rico
20th-century Puerto Rican actresses
21st-century Puerto Rican actresses
Puerto Rican beauty pageant winners
Puerto Rican expatriates in the Philippines
Puerto Rican female models
Puerto Rican film actresses
Puerto Rican television actresses
ABS-CBN personalities
Filipino television variety show hosts